Hu Qingyu Tang is a historically significant Chinese pharmaceutical company. It is as well known as a Tongrentang in Beijing.

Foundation
It was founded by Hu Xueyan with the south architectural style in 1874, located at 95 Dajing Lane alongside West Lake in Hangzhou, Zhejiang Province. The drugstore opened in 1878 at a cost of more than 200 thousand taels and operated on the principle of  Taiping Huimin and the Bureau agents. It made more than four hundred types of drug by  collecting secret prescriptions, proved recipes and combining clinical practice.

Development
Hu Qing Yu Tang has become the only Chinese medicine museum. In 1988, it became a national key cultural relics protection unit. There are five parts: 
The exhibition hall, which introduces celebrities in Chinese medicine history, the origin of medicine, the development of pharmaceutics, the exchanges of China and foreign countries in medicine and the contributions of Zhejiang Province in the development of medicine.
Chinese medicine manual mill hall, where experienced pharmaceutical workers show visitors traditional pharmaceutical process and visitors can experience by themselves.
Patient room of traditional Chinese medicine health care
The hall of medicated food
Business lobby, where visitors can use the pharmaceutical tools and buy Chinese drugs.
Hu Qing Yu Tang participated in World Leisure Expo for a healthy life in September, 2011.

References

External links
Official web site

Traditional Chinese medicine
Government-owned companies of China
Major National Historical and Cultural Sites in Zhejiang
Tourist attractions in Hangzhou